SEAL may refer to:
 "SEa/Air/Land" and analogous military tactical teams:
 United States Navy SEALs
 The Thailand Navy SEALs, an  Underwater Demolition Assault Unit
 Other "SEAL" acronyms:
 SEAL (cipher), a cryptographic algorithm
 Sea Scout Experience Advanced Leadership (SEAL) training
 Social and Emotional Aspects of Learning, a UK program re education  
 Select Entry Accelerated Learning, a program used in Victoria, Australia, in some secondary schools
 Southeast Asian Linguistics Society (SEALS)

See also
 Seal (disambiguation)
 Seals (disambiguation)
 Navy SEALs (disambiguation)